Scaevola floribunda is a species of plant in the family Goodeniaceae. It is endemic to Fiji.

References

floribunda
Endemic flora of Fiji
Least concern flora of Oceania
Taxa named by Asa Gray
Taxonomy articles created by Polbot